"Every Time You Take Your Time" is a song recorded, co-written, and co-produced by Canadian-American country artist Aaron Goodvin. He wrote the track with Ed Hill and Jimmy Ritchey. It was the fourth single off his second studio album V.

Background
"Every Time You Take Your Time" was inspired by Goodvin's wife Victoria.

Critical reception
Nanci Dagg of Canadian Beats Media said that "hearing the lyrics to this romantic love ballad you can’t help but realize the love they have for each other", referring to Goodvin and his wife, adding that the "song is truly written from his heart".

Commercial performance
"Every Time You Take Your Time" reached a peak of #15 on the Billboard Canada Country chart dated March 20, 2021, becoming Goodvin's sixth career Top 20 hit.

Music video
The official music video for "Every Time You Take Your Time" premiered on ET Canada on August 27, 2020, and was directed by Sean Hagwell. It stars both Goodvin and his wife Victoria, with Goodvin adding it was "the perfect time to give her the spotlight.

Charts

References

2019 songs
2020 singles
Aaron Goodvin songs
Warner Music Group singles
Songs written by Aaron Goodvin
Songs written by Ed Hill
Songs written by Jimmy Ritchey